Lukáš Masopust (born 12 February 1993) is a Czech football player who currently plays for Slavia Prague in the Czech First League and the Czech Republic national team.

Club career

Early career
Masopust was born in the town of Božejov, near Pelhřimov. He began his football career there, before moving to Kamenice na Lípou and then to Jihlava in 2004. In 2012, Jihlava manager František Komňacký promoted him to the senior team and he went on to make his debut for the club against Slavia Prague that year. The match ended in a 3–3, to which Masopust contributed two assists.

In December 2014, Masopust reached an agreement to join Jablonec on 1 January 2015, on a contract running until 1 July 2018. He made his debut for the club against 1. FC Slovácko on 20 February 2015, coming on as a 75th minute substitute for Nermin Crnkić.

Slavia Prague
On 18 December 2018, Slavia Prague announced the signing of Masopust from Jablonec on a three and a half year contract. On 22 May 2019, Masopust scored Slavia's second goal in their 2–0 defeat of Baník Ostrava in the 2019 Czech Cup Final. On 20 August 2019, Masopust scored in Slavia Prague's UEFA Champions League first leg play-off win against Romanian side CFR Cluj. Slavia would win the second leg as well to qualify for the group stage of Europe's premier knock-out competition for just the second time in their history.

Masopust started for Slavia in the final of the Czech Cup on 20 May 2021, but was replaced by 19-year-old teammate Abdallah Sima in the 60th minute. Sima would go on to score the only goal of the game against Viktoria Plzeň as Slavia won the league and cup double. In the final match of the league season on 29 May 2021, Slavia defeated Dynamo České Budějovice to clinch an undefeated record in the league. It was the first time a Czech club reached this milestone since rivals Sparta Prague did so in 2009–10.

International career
He made his Czech Republic national team debut on 26 March 2018 in a friendly against China.

On 25 May 2021, Masopust was included in the final 26-man squad for the postponed UEFA Euro 2020 tournament. In the final warm-up match before the tournament on 8 June, Masopust scored as the Czechs defeated Albania 3–1.

Career statistics

Club

International
Scores and results list the Czech Republic's goal tally first.

Honours

Club
Slavia Prague
Czech First League: 2018–19, 2019–20, 2020–21
Czech Cup: 2018–19, 2020–21

References

External links
 
 
 
 

1993 births
Living people
People from Pelhřimov District
Association football midfielders
Czech footballers
Czech Republic youth international footballers
Czech Republic under-21 international footballers
Czech Republic international footballers
Czech First League players
FC Vysočina Jihlava players
FK Jablonec players
SK Slavia Prague players
UEFA Euro 2020 players
Sportspeople from the Vysočina Region